Enrique Mendoza (born 11 August 1945) is a Venezuelan politician. From 1989 until 1996, Mendoza was the mayor of Sucre Municipality, Miranda of Caracas; he was governor of Miranda state from 1995 to 2004, being re-elected in 1998 and 2000. In 2004 Mendoza was chosen as head of the Coordinadora Democrática.

The U.S. Department of State mentioned Mendoza in its 2008 Human Rights report as denial of a fair public trial.

Notes

External links 
 https://web.archive.org/web/20110815174425/http://english.eluniversal.com/2005/03/01/en_pol_art_01A537121.shtml
 https://web.archive.org/web/20130616102201/http://english.eluniversal.com/2006/03/08/en_pol_art_08A680695.shtml
 https://archive.today/20130122010039/http://english.eluniversal.com/2007/12/17/en_pol_art_dissenters-ask-chave_17A1264319.shtml

1945 births
Politicians from Caracas
Governors of Miranda (state)
Human rights in Venezuela
Living people
Mayors of places in Venezuela
Copei politicians